CyborgNest Ltd is a wearable start-up company headquartered in London, United Kingdom. The start-up created a wearable which used haptic technology (vibrations) to convey information to the wearer called NorthSense. The device was released in 2017 to connect wearers to the earth's magnetic field.

NorthSense 
In 2017 CyborgNest released the NorthSense, a miniaturized circuit board with over 200 components, with a silicone sleeve. The device was attached to the wearer's chest via steel piercings, and indicated when the wearer faced magnetic north, via a vibration. The device was inspired by a previous wearable called NorthPaw created by Sensebridge. It is unclear whether humans do, or did, possess this sense, 

The device was made in a production batch of 400 units. NorthSense was documented in some technology articles. 

The technology follows the principles of Sensory Substitution Devices (SSD), created by neuroscientist Paul Bach-y-Rita in the 1960s. SSDs are devices which translate one sense into another in order to compensate for an impaired sense. NorthSense also builds on the research of other similar haptics devices, such as the naviBelt (previously feelspace belt), which gives directional information through haptic motors around the wearer's waist. NorthSense was created using SSD principles but as a non-therapeutic device (not for medical use), transmitting non-human sensory information (the Earth's magnetic field), and therefore it is categorised as a ‘sensory augmentation’ technology.

Controversies

Sentero 
CyborgNest ran an Indiegogo crowdfunding campaign for the Sentero (presale) in July 2020 where crowdfunders raised approximately £50,000. Sentero was never delivered to its crowdfunders and production has now been indefinitely delayed. 

Like the NorthSense, Sentero claimed that it would allow wearers to haptically feel the earth's magnetic field (North), and also added the ability to 'sense' the direction of places and people, and feel their heartbeat.

See also 
 Sensory Substitution
 Human Enhancement
 Body Hacking
 Neil Harbisson
 Moon Ribas
 Posthumanism
 Extended Mind

References 

Transhumanism
Electronics companies established in 2017
Biotechnology companies established in 2017
Biotechnology companies of the United Kingdom
Electronics companies of the United Kingdom
Privately held companies of the United Kingdom
Emerging technologies
Bionics
Neurotechnology